Xylophanes is a genus of moths in the family Sphingidae erected by Jacob Hübner in 1819. As of 2000, there are about 96 species and subspecies included in the genus.

Species

Xylophanes acrus Rothschild & Jordan, 1910
Xylophanes adalia (H. Druce, 1881)
Xylophanes aglaor (Boisduval, 1875)
Xylophanes alexandrei Haxaire & Vaglia, 2009
Xylophanes alvarezsierrai Alvarez Corral, 2001
Xylophanes amadis (Stoll, 1782)
Xylophanes anubus (Cramer, 1777)
Xylophanes aristor (Boisduval, 1870)
Xylophanes balcazari Haxaire & Vaglia, 2008
Xylophanes barbuti Haxaire & Eitschberger, 2007
Xylophanes belti (H. Druce, 1878)
Xylophanes bilineata Gehlen, 1928
Xylophanes blanca Eitschberger, 2001
Xylophanes ceratomioides (Grote & Robinson, 1867)
Xylophanes chiron (Drury, 1773)
Xylophanes clarki Ramsden, 1921
Xylophanes colinae Haxaire, 1994
Xylophanes columbiana Clark, 1935
Xylophanes cosmius Rothschild & Jordan, 1906
Xylophanes crenulata Vaglia & Haxaire, 2009
Xylophanes crotonis (Walker, 1856)
Xylophanes cthulhu Haxaire & Vaglia, 2008
Xylophanes cyrene (H. Druce, 1881)
Xylophanes damocrita (H. Druce, 1894)
Xylophanes depuiseti (Boisduval, 1875)
Xylophanes docilis (Butler, 1875)
Xylophanes dolius (Rothschild & Jordan, 1906)
Xylophanes elara (H. Druce, 1878)
Xylophanes epaphus (Boisduval, 1875)
Xylophanes eumedon (Boisduval, 1875)
Xylophanes falco (Walker, 1856)
Xylophanes fassli Gehlen, 1928
Xylophanes fernandezi Chacin, Clavijo & De Marmels, 1996
Xylophanes ferotinus Gehlen, 1930
Xylophanes fosteri Rothschild & Jordan, 1906
Xylophanes furtadoi Haxaire, 2009
Xylophanes fusimacula (R. Felder, 1874)
Xylophanes germen (Schaus, 1890)
Xylophanes godmani (H. Druce, 1882)
Xylophanes guianensis (Rothschild, 1894)
Xylophanes gundlachii (Herrich-Schäffer, 1863)
Xylophanes hannemanni Closs, 1917
Xylophanes haxairei Cadiou, 1985
Xylophanes huloti Haxaire & Vaglia, 2008
Xylophanes hydrata Rothschild & Jordan, 1903
Xylophanes indistincta Closs, 1915
Xylophanes irrorata (Grote, 1865)
Xylophanes isaon (Boisduval, 1875)
Xylophanes jamaicensis Clark, 1935
Xylophanes jordani Clark, 1916
Xylophanes josephinae Clark, 1920
Xylophanes juanita Rothschild & Jordan, 1903
Xylophanes kaempferi Clark, 1931
Xylophanes katharinae Clark, 1931
Xylophanes kiefferi Cadiou, 1995
Xylophanes lamontagnei Vaglia & Haxaire, 2007
Xylophanes letiranti Vaglia & Haxaire, 2003
Xylophanes libya (H. Druce, 1878)
Xylophanes lichyi Kitching & Cadiou, 2000
Xylophanes lissyi Eitschberger, 2001
Xylophanes loelia (H. Druce, 1878)
Xylophanes lolita Haxaire & Vaglia, 2008
Xylophanes macasensis Clark, 1922
Xylophanes maculator (Boisduval, 1875)
Xylophanes marginalis Clark, 1917
Xylophanes media Rothschild & Jordan, 1903
Xylophanes meridanus Rothschild & Jordan, 1910
Xylophanes mineti Haxaire & Vaglia, 2004
Xylophanes mirabilis Clark, 1916
Xylophanes monzoni Haxaire & Eitschberger, 2003
Xylophanes mossi Clark, 1917
Xylophanes mulleri Clark, 1920
Xylophanes nabuchodonosor Oberthür, 1904
Xylophanes neoptolemus (Cramer, 1780)
Xylophanes norfolki Kernbach, 1962
Xylophanes obscurus Rothschild & Jordan, 1910
Xylophanes ockendeni Rothschild, 1904
Xylophanes pearsoni Soares & Motta, 2002
Xylophanes pistacina (Boisduval, 1875)
Xylophanes ploetzi (Moschler, 1876)
Xylophanes pluto (Fabricius, 1777)
Xylophanes porcus (Hübner, 1823)
Xylophanes porioni Cadiou, 2000
Xylophanes pyrrhus Rothschild & Jordan, 1906
Xylophanes resta Rothschild & Jordan, 1903
Xylophanes rhodina Rothschild & Jordan, 1903
Xylophanes rhodocera (Walker, 1856)
Xylophanes rhodochlora Rothschild & Jordan, 1903
Xylophanes rhodotus Rothschild, 1904
Xylophanes robinsonii (Grote, 1865)
Xylophanes rothschildi (Dognin, 1895)
Xylophanes rufescens (Rothschild, 1894)
Xylophanes sarae Haxaire, 1989
Xylophanes schausi (Rothschild, 1894)
Xylophanes schreiteri Clark, 1923
Xylophanes schwartzi Haxaire, 1992
Xylophanes staudingeri (Rothschild, 1894)
Xylophanes suana (H. Druce, 1889)
Xylophanes tersa (Linnaeus, 1771)
Xylophanes thyelia (Linnaeus, 1758)
Xylophanes titana (H. Druce, 1878)
Xylophanes turbata (H. Edwards, 1887)
Xylophanes tyndarus (Boisduval, 1875)
Xylophanes undata Rothschild & Jordan, 1903
Xylophanes vagliai Haxaire, 2003
Xylophanes virescens (Butler, 1875)
Xylophanes xylobotes (Burmeister, 1878)
Xylophanes zurcheri (H. Druce, 1894)

References

 
Macroglossini
Sphingidae of South America
Moths of South America
Taxa named by Jacob Hübner
Moth genera